Działy  is a village in the administrative district of Gmina Glinojeck, within Ciechanów County, Masovian Voivodeship, in northeastern Poland.

References